Prof. Mohammad Naseem Faruqui was the Vice-Chancellor of Aligarh Muslim University from 1990-1994. Prof. Faruqui obtained his Ph.D degree in 1965 from IIT Kharagpur and served as its Deputy Director.

References

Vice-Chancellors of the Aligarh Muslim University
Year of birth missing
2012 deaths